Acosmeryx naga is a moth of the family Sphingidae. It was described by Frederic Moore in 1858, and is known from Japan, Tajikistan, Afghanistan, China and South-east Asia.

Description 
The wingspan is 86–112 mm.

Distribution
In northern China, there is one generation per year, with adults on wing from April to June. In Korea, adults are on wing from early May to mid-August.

Biology 
The larva of the species have been found on plants in the genera Vitis, Ampelopsis, Actinidia, and Saurauia.

Subspecies
Acosmeryx naga naga (Himalayan foothills of Pakistan, India, Nepal and China, Peninsular Malaysia, Thailand, northern Vietnam, eastern and southern China, Taiwan, Korea and Japan)
Acosmeryx naga hissarica Shchetkin, 1956 (southern Tajikistan and Afghanistan)

References

Acosmeryx
Moths described in 1858
Moths of Asia